Concurso Nacional de Belleza 1975 was held on April 26, 1975. There were 28 candidates who competed for the national crown. The winner represented the Dominican Republic at the Miss Universe 1975. Second place was crowned as the Virreina al Miss Mundo, representing the Dominican Republic at Miss World 1975.

Results

Señorita República Dominicana 1975 : Milvia Sofia Troncoso Hernández (Dajabón)
Virreina al Miss Mundo : Carmen Rosa Arredondo Pou (Ciudad Santo Domingo)
1st Runner Up : Roberta Angelo (Santiago)
2nd Runner Up : Carlixta Suarez (La Estrelleta)
3rd Runner Up : Angelica Trono (Puerto Plata)

Top 10

Ana Londron (Distrito Nacional)
Sofia del Valle (Espaillat)
Indhira Vasquez (La Vega)
Hilda Abreu (Santiago Rodríguez)
Denise Medina (Pedernales)

Special awards
 Miss Rostro Bello – Milvia Troncoso (Dajabón)
 Miss Photogenic (voted by press reporters) - Nidia Rosario (Azua)
 Miss Congeniality (voted by Miss Dominican Republic Universe contestants) - Yani Hidalgo (Séibo)
 Best Provincial Costume - Eva Trollo (Monte Cristi)

Delegates

 Azua - Nidia Agnes Rosario Nova
 Baoruco - Levia Carmen García Oviedo
 Barahona - Martha Ines Fanton Santos
 Dajabón - Milvia Sofia Troncoso Hernández
 Distrito Nacional - Ana Carolina Londron Peralta
 Duarte - Bellanida Fernández E.
 Espaillat - Sofia Carolina del Valle Vargas
 Independencia - Gabriela Carol Rivas Duarte
 La Altagracia - Patricia Garmania Correa Suarez
 La Estrelleta - María Carlixta Suarez Ramírez
 La Romana - Cristina Desire González Ramos
 La Vega - Indhira Zamora Vasquez Garca
 María Trinidad Sánchez - Gloria Irlanda Batista Acosta
 Monte Cristi - Eva Teresa Trollo Corono
 Pedernales - Odalise Denise Medina Menna
 Peravia - Laura del Carmen Toledo Ruiz
 Puerto Plata - Angelica María Trono Velasquez
 Salcedo - Thelma Vargas
 Samaná - Nidia Antonia Rodríguez
 Sánchez Ramírez - Ana Gabriela Valdez Fabian
 San Cristóbal -  Colombia Vaviana Santana Zaragoza
 San Juan de la Maguana - Estefania Yamilet Vargas Ruiz
 San Pedro - Kayla María Sosa Martínez
 Santiago - Ana María Roberta Angelo del Rosario
 Santiago Rodríguez - Hilda María Abreu Nivo
 Séibo - Yani Bereniz Hidalgo Sombras
 Santo Domingo de Guzmán -  Carmen Rosa Arredondo Pou
 Valverde - María Sofia Acosta Reyes

Miss Dominican Republic
1975 beauty pageants
1975 in the Dominican Republic